Kenneth Shepsle (born September 10, 1945) is an American political scientist who is influential for rational choice scholarship. He is George D. Markham professor of government at Harvard University, and a research associate at the Institute for Quantitative Social Science there. He is a fellow of the American Academy of Arts and Sciences and of the National Academy of Sciences.

As an undergraduate, he majored in mathematics at the University of North Carolina at Chapel Hill. His doctorate is from University of Rochester.

References

Harvard University faculty
American political scientists
University of Rochester alumni
1945 births
Living people
Washington University in St. Louis faculty
University of North Carolina at Chapel Hill alumni